Journey to the Edge of the Universe is a documentary film broadcast on National Geographic and the Discovery Channel. It depicts a simulated space journey from Earth to the edge of the universe. The US edition was narrated by Alec Baldwin and the UK edition by Sean Pertwee.

The documentary runs 91 minutes and was broadcast on December 7, 2008.

Synopsis
The documentary gives the impression of using a single, continuous take to visualize a journey from the Earth to the edge of the Universe, which is explained to be the Big Bang. CGI animation was used to create the film.

Media
Both Blu-ray and DVD releases of the documentary were released on 31 March 2009.

See also
 Shape of the universe

References

External links

 Journey to the Edge of the Universe on NationalGeographic.com
 

National Geographic (American TV channel) original programming
Discovery Channel original programming
2008 documentary films
Documentary films about outer space
2008 films